Clementina Morgari Lomazzi (Guastalla, 1819 – Turin, 1897) was an Italian painter, mainly of genre scenes of intimate, family moments.

Biography
She studied at the Accademia Albertina of Turin under Francesco Scaramuzzi, and married Paolo Emilio Morgari (1815-1882), a painter of sacred subjects, who was the brother of Rodolfo Morgari, professor of ornamentation at the academy. Clementina had two children Luigi Morgari (1857-) and Beatrice Morgari (1858-), both painters. Tommaso Juglaris was one of her pupils. In 1856 she was nominated honorary associate of the Academy of Modena and in 1864 to the Academy of Urbino. She exhibited at the Promotrice of Turin from 1845 to 1881.

References

19th-century Italian painters
1819 births
1897 deaths
Painters from Piedmont
Italian genre painters
Accademia Albertina alumni
19th-century Italian women artists
Italian women painters